David or Dave Roberts may refer to:

Arts and literature
 David Roberts (painter) (1796–1864), Scottish painter
 David Roberts (art collector), Scottish contemporary art collector
 David Roberts (novelist), English editor and mystery writer
 David Roberts (illustrator) (born 1970), British children's illustrator
 David Thomas Roberts (born 1955), American composer
 Dave Roberts (musician), English musician
 David Roberts, singer with American a cappella group Straight No Chaser
 Dewi Havhesp (1831–1884), Welsh poet born David Roberts

Film and television
 David Roberts (Australian actor), Australian actor who has appeared in television, film and theatre
 Dave Roberts (American actor), American actor
 Dave Roberts (broadcaster) (David Thomas Boreanaz, born 1936), American television personality
 Dave Roberts (EastEnders), a fictional character in the British television series EastEnders

Sports

Baseball
 Dave Roberts (outfielder) (born 1972), American baseball manager and former player
 Dave Roberts (first baseman) (1933-2021), Panamanian former baseball player
 Dave Roberts (pitcher) (1944–2009), American baseball player
 Dave Roberts (third baseman) (born 1951), American former baseball player

Other sports
 Dave Roberts (American football) (born 1947), US college football coach
 Dave Roberts (sports broadcaster) (born 1964), TV and radio sports broadcaster and football referee
 Dave Roberts (English footballer) (fl. 1923–1926), English centre forward
 Dave Roberts (Welsh footballer) (born 1949), played for Fulham, Oxford United, Hull City, and Cardiff City
 David Roberts (pole vaulter) (born 1951), American pole vaulter
 David Roberts (ice hockey) (born 1970), American ice hockey forward
 David Roberts (swimmer) (born 1980), Welsh Paralympic gold medalist
 David Roberts (cricketer, born 1976), English cricketer
 David Roberts (MCC cricketer) (born 1942), English cricketer

Other fields
 David Roberts (academic) (born 1937), Australian professor of German studies
 David Roberts (architect) (1911–1982), British architect and educator
 Dave Roberts (California politician) (born 1960), politician in San Diego County, California
 David Roberts (climber) (1943–2021), mountaineer and author
 David Roberts (diplomat) (1924–1987), British ambassador to Lebanon, Syria, and the United Arab Emirates
 David Roberts (engineer) (1859–1928), English inventor of the caterpillar track
 David Roberts (mayor) (born 1956), mayor of Hoboken, New Jersey
 David Roberts (MP) (fl. 1572–1593), Member of Parliament for Cardiff
 David Roberts (priest) (died 1935), Welsh Anglican priest
 David Gwilym Morris Roberts (1925–2020), British civil engineer
 David Lloyd Roberts (1835–1920), gynaecologist, medical author and bibliophile
 David G. Roberts (1928–1999), justice of the Maine Supreme Judicial Court

See also
 David Robert (born 1969), French footballer